Serre may refer to:

 Serre (surname)
 Serre (grape), a red Italian wine grape
 Serre (river), a tributary of the Oise in France
 Serre, Campania, a town and comune in Salerno, Campania, Italy
 Serre-lès-Puisieux, a village in Pas-de-Calais department, northern France
 Serre Chevalier, a French ski resort in the Alps
 Serre Calabresi, a mountain and hill area of Calabria, Italy

See also
 Serr, a surname
 Serres (disambiguation)
 La Serre (disambiguation)